Bolsward (West Frisian: Boalsert) is a city in Súdwest-Fryslân in the province of Friesland, the Netherlands. Bolsward has a population of just under 10,200. It is located 10 km W.N.W. of Sneek.

History 
The town is founded on three artificial dwelling mounds, the first of which was built some time before Christ.
During the Middle Ages, Bolsward was a trade center and port city connected to the North Sea via the Middle Sea. This connection was lost when the Middle Sea was reclaimed to form arable land. After this, a canal was dug to the Zuiderzee. The town is first mentioned in AD 725.

As a trading city, Bolsward was granted city rights by Philip the Good in 1455. Bolsward was made a member of the Hanseatic league in 1422. Before being merged into the municipality of Súdwest-Fryslân, the town of Bolsward was an independent municipality.

Notable historical figures 
Notable historical figures born here include:
 Juw Juwinga or Jonghema (14th century), 11th potestate of Friesland
 Petrus Thaborita (1450–1527), historian
 Boetius Adamsz Bolswert (c.1580-1633), engraver
 Schelderic Adamsz Bolswert (c.1586-1659), engraver
 Gysbert Japiks (1603–1666), poet
 Frederick Philipse (1626–1702), American progenitor and founder
 Willem Muurling (1805–1882), theologian
 Titus Brandsma (1881–1942), Carmelite philosopher

Events
Heamiel. A local festival of four days in June. This is an old traditional festival to celebrate that the farmers finished getting the hay from the fields. The name of the festival, Heamiel, is Frisian for 'Hay meal', and is derived from the traditional banquet.

Bolletongersdei. Bolletongersdei is Frisian for 'bulls Thursday'. Bolletongersdei includes a street market. Bolletongersdei is held on the first Thursday of October.

Simmerwike. A festival of four evenings with musical performances, held in August.

Elfstedentocht
Bolsward is one of the eleven Frisian cities in which the ice skating Elfstedentocht, an ice skating marathon, is held. Because the marathon depends on the thickness of the ice, it is not held on a regular schedule and is somewhat rare.

Bolsward is also the host city for the yearly Cycling Elfstedentocht, a road bicycle racing tour.

Notable buildings 
 Protestant church of Bolsward
 Gysbert Japicx House, birth place and museum about Gysbert Japiks.
Broerekerk (burned 1980, repurposed 2006)

References

External links
 
Official website

Municipalities of the Netherlands disestablished in 2011
Cities in the Netherlands
Cities in Friesland
Former municipalities of Friesland
Populated places in Friesland
Súdwest-Fryslân